Make Me Smile – The Best of Steve Harley and Cockney Rebel is a compilation album by the British band Steve Harley & Cockney Rebel, released by EMI in 1992.

Background
Harley was approached by EMI to personally select the 16 tracks featured on Make Me Smile – The Best of Steve Harley and Cockney Rebel. Harley told the Newcastle Evening Chronicle in 1992, "I have been on the road for three years [since returning to touring in 1989], so I know which ones people prefer. It's a pretty good retrospective." Harley added to Record Collector, "There is at least one track from every album I ever made. I can't stop EMI, they can licence what they own to anyone they like. I have no thoughts on it at all. It's the past. I get paid."

To coincide with the compilation's release and the band's upcoming UK tour, EMI re-issued "Make Me Smile (Come Up and See Me)" as a single. The album failed to enter the UK Albums Chart, but the single reached No. 46 in the UK Singles Chart and remained in the top 100 for two weeks.

Critical reception

On its release, Peter Kinghorn of the Newcastle Evening Chronicle commented, "Compiled with loving care by Steve himself, this anthology has some knockout tracks – all of which have grown in stature with the passing of time." Adam Higginbotham of Select was negative in his review, writing, "Apart from their indisputable high point, the superb 'Make Me Smile', the material produced at the peak of their popularity in the mid-'70s is now acutely embarrassing."

Track listing

Personnel
Production
 Steve Harley – producer (tracks 1–5, 7–11, 14–16)
 Alan Parsons – producer (tracks 1, 4, 7, 9, 16)
 Mickie Most – producer (track 3)
 Stuart Breed – remixer (track 3)
 Jimmy Horowitz – producer (track 5)
 Neil Harrison – producer (tracks 6, 12)
 Michael J. Jackson – producer (track 13)

Other
 Michael Heatley – liner notes

References

Steve Harley & Cockney Rebel albums
1992 greatest hits albums
EMI Records compilation albums